Tarnica is a peak in the Bieszczady Mountains in southern Poland. Its height is 1,346 metres. It is one of the Polish Crown Peaks.

The summit towers 500 metres above the Wołosatka Valley. It can be easily told apart from its neighbours by its distinctive shape. The mountain has two separate summits, one of 1,339 and one of 1,346 metres. The southern part is a steep rocky wall, while the other side consist of less steep rocky fields.

Hiking trails
 European walking route E8
 Prešov - Miháľov - Kurimka - Dukla - Iwonicz-Zdrój – Rymanów-Zdrój - Puławy – Tokarnia (778 m) – Kamień (717 m) – Komańcza - Cisna - Ustrzyki Górne - Tarnica - Wołosate.

See also

 Bieszczady National Park

Mountains of Poland
Mountains of the Eastern Carpathians
Landforms of Podkarpackie Voivodeship